The Cat and the Canary is a 1939 American horror comedy film directed by Elliott Nugent starring Bob Hope and Paulette Goddard. It is a remake of the 1927 silent film The Cat and the Canary, which was based on the 1922 play of the same name by John Willard.

Universal Home Entertainment released the film on DVD in 2010 as part of the Bob Hope: Thanks for the Memories Collection and again in 2011 individually as a part of their "Universal Vault Series" on Amazon.com. Kino Lorber released it on Blu-ray on September 15, 2020.

The film's copyright was renewed in 1966.

Plot 

Cyrus Norman was a millionaire who lived in the Louisiana bayous with his mistress Miss Lu (Gale Sondergaard). Norman died ten years previous, and now an American Indian man (George Regas) paddles the executor of Norman's estate, Mr. Crosby (George Zucco), through alligator-infested waters to Norman's isolated mansion, where his will is to be read at midnight. At the mansion, Crosby meets Miss Lu, who lives there with a large black cat. When he removes the will from a safe, he discovers that someone has tampered with it.

Crosby and Miss Lu are joined by Norman's surviving relatives: Joyce Norman (Paulette Goddard), Fred Blythe (John Beal), Charles Wilder (Douglass Montgomery), Cicily Young (Nydia Westman), Aunt Susan Tilbury (Elizabeth Patterson), and Wally Campbell (Bob Hope). As the group gathers in the parlor to read the will, an unseen gong rings seven times. According to Miss Lu, this means that only seven of the eight people present will survive the night.

Norman's will has two parts. The first indicates that Joyce will inherit the entire estate, under one condition: concerned about a streak of insanity in the family's blood, Norman stipulated that his heirs must remain sane for the next 30 days. If Joyce loses her sanity during that time, the heir will be determined from the second part of the will. This arrangement raises concerns about Joyce's safety, since other family members can increase their chances of inheriting by murdering her or driving her insane.

After the reading, Crosby informs everyone that they will have to stay overnight; Miss Lu warns them of spirits in the house; and a security guard found prowling outside claims that a murderer called "The Cat" has escaped from the nearby insane asylum. In the parlor, Crosby tries to warn Joyce about something, but a hidden doorway opens in the wall and someone pulls him into the space behind it. Joyce becomes frightened when everyone except Wally believes she imagined this.

Amid suspicion and accusations, Miss Lu gives Joyce a letter from Norman that Joyce and Wally use to find a diamond necklace. Joyce puts the necklace under her pillow in Norman's room, but after she falls asleep, a hand reaches out from the wall, terrifies her, and takes the necklace. At this point, Joyce is almost out of her mind with fear and confusion, but Wally finds a movable wall panel near her bed and opens a hidden door leading to a secret passageway. Crosby's dead body falls out from behind the door.

To help Joyce recover from her fright, Wally chats to her in the parlor. When he leaves to fetch some liquor, he hears something in Norman's room, opens the hidden door, and explores the passageway. Meanwhile, Joyce sees the door in the parlor as it opens. When Wally calls to her, she hears him through the passageway and enters it to find him. Once she is inside, someone closes the door.

With no exit, Joyce explores the passageway, walking past a dark cranny where the security guard is hiding. The Cat also walks past the guard, who stops him and takes the necklace from him, but the Cat stabs the guard in the back and follows Joyce, who has discovered a door leading outside. After the Cat chases Joyce into a shed and threatens her with a knife, Wally arrives and calls him "Charlie", having found the second part of the will in Charles's coat. Charles removes his Cat mask, pins Wally to the wall with his knife, and begins to strangle Joyce, but Miss Lu arrives with a shotgun and kills him. The next day, Wally and Joyce explain the story to newspaper reporters and unofficially announce their engagement.

Cast
 Bob Hope as Wally Campbell
 Paulette Goddard as Joyce Norman
 John Beal as Fred Blythe
 Douglass Montgomery as Charles Wilder
 Gale Sondergaard as Miss Lu
 Elizabeth Patterson as Aunt Susan 
 Nydia Westman as Cicily 
 George Zucco as Lawyer Crosby
 John Wray as Hendricks
 George Regas as Indian guide

Critical reception
The New York Times wrote that Elliott Nugent "has directed it smartly, taking full advantage of the standard chiller devices for frightening the susceptible of his audience but never losing sight of his main objective—comedy...the objective is carried briskly and to our complete satisfaction. Good show."  

Variety wrote that the movie retained "the basic spooky atmosphere and chiller situations" of the original play and "will amply satisfy the mystery fans, and provide spine-chilling thrills for audiences generally."

References

External links

 
 
 
 
 

1939 films
1939 horror films
American black-and-white films
American comedy horror films
American crime comedy films
Remakes of American films
American films based on plays
American haunted house films
Comedy mystery films
Films directed by Elliott Nugent
Films scored by Ernst Toch
Films set in country houses
Films set in Louisiana
Paramount Pictures films
Sound film remakes of silent films
1930s English-language films
1930s American films